The Plow Woman is a 1917 American silent drama film directed by Charles Swickard and starring Mary MacLaren, Harry De More and Marie Hazelton.

Cast
 Mary MacLaren as Mary MacTavish 
 Harry De More as Andy MacTavish 
 Marie Hazelton as Ruth MacTavish 
 Lee Shumway as Lieutenant Jack Fraser 
 Kingsley Benedict as Surgeon Fraser 
 Hector V. Sarno as Buck Matthews 
 Clara Horton as Mary, as a child 
 Eddie Polo as Bill Matthews 
 George Hupp as Jack, as a child 
 Tommy Burns as Trooper

References

Bibliography
 Robert B. Connelly. The Silents: Silent Feature Films, 1910-36, Volume 40, Issue 2. December Press, 1998.

External links
 

1917 films
1917 drama films
1910s English-language films
American silent feature films
Silent American drama films
American black-and-white films
Films directed by Charles Swickard
Universal Pictures films
1910s American films